Jorge D'Elía (born April 28, 1938 in La Plata, Argentina) is an Argentine film and television actor, as well as a playwright. He's mostly known for his role in the tv series Los Simuladores. He's the father of actor Federico D'Elia.

Filmography (partial)
 El Fondo del mar (2003) aka The Bottom of the Sea 
 Guaschos (2004)
 El Abrazo partido (2004) aka Lost Embrace 
 El Aura (2005) aka The Aura 
 Un Día (2006)
 7th Floor (2013)

Television (partial)
 Los Simuladores (2002) aka Pretenders
 El Precio del poder (2002)
 Locas de amor (2004)
 Sálvame María (2005)
 Hechizada (2006)

References

External links
 

1938 births
Living people
Argentine male television actors
Argentine male film actors
21st-century Argentine male actors
People from La Plata